Atylomyia is a genus of flies in the family Tachinidae.

Species
A. albifrons Villeneuve, 1911
A. chinensis Zhang et Ge, 2007 
A. loewi Brauer, 1898
A. mesnili Herting, 1981
A. minutiungula Zhang et Wang, 2007

References

Tachinidae genera
Exoristinae
Taxa named by Friedrich Moritz Brauer